Air Moorea was a French airline based on the grounds of Faa'a International Airport in Faaa, Tahiti, French Polynesia, France near Papeete. It operated passenger services within the Polynesian islands. Its main base was Faa'a International Airport.

History
The airline started operations in September 1968 and was wholly owned by Air Tahiti.

As of November 2010, the airline appeared to have stopped operations. While it's not known what airlines their planes went to, at least one of their planes, F-OHJG, moved into operation with Air Antilles.

Fleet

The Air Moorea fleet includes the following aircraft (at March 2007):

3 De Havilland Canada DHC-6 Twin Otter Series 300
On order: 2 Viking DHC-6 Twin Otter Series 400

Accidents and incidents
On 9 August 2007, an Air Moorea Flight 1121 with 19 passengers and one pilot on board crashed into the lagoon about a minute after takeoff from Moorea Airport (Temae Airport) on the French Polynesian island of Moorea, with the loss of 20 lives. The flight was heading for the Tahiti, Faa'a International Airport.

The airline stated that this was its first crash in its 39-year history.

References

External links

Official website
Official website 
 Air Moorea (Archive) 

Defunct airlines of France
Airlines of French Polynesia
Airlines established in 1968
Airlines disestablished in 2010
1968 establishments in French Polynesia